Meyami is a city in Semnan Province, Iran.

Meyami may also refer to:
 Meyami, Razavi Khorasan
 Meyami County, an administrative subdivision in Semnan Province
 Meyami District, a former administrative subdivision of Semnan Province
 Meyami Rural District (disambiguation)